All India Institute of Medical Sciences, Gorakhpur better known as AIIMS Gorakhpur is a public medical university located in the Gorakhpur, Uttar Pradesh, India and one of the All India Institutes of Medical Sciences. It is one of the four "Phase-IV" All India Institutes of Medical Sciences (AIIMS) announced in July 2014.

History

Prime Minister Narendra Modi laid the foundation stone of AIIMS Gorakhpur on 22 July 2016. An outpatient department (OPD) started on 24 February 2019 and the first batch of 50 MBBS students started later that year, making it one of six AIIMSs to become operational in 2019. Surekha Kishor was appointed director in March 2020.

Academics 
It started operation of an outpatient department (OPD) in February 2019 and started MBBS courses later that year, making it one of the six AIIMSs to become operational in 2019.

Controversy
The executive director of AIIMS Gorakhpur, Dr Surekha Kishore was alleged to have forced medical students to show her their private messages and files on their mobile phones. It was also alleged she directed guards of the institutes to confine students in their rooms.

See also

 AIIMS Raebareli

References

External links 
 

Gorakhpur
Hospitals in Uttar Pradesh
Medical colleges in Uttar Pradesh
Educational institutions established in 2019
Hospitals established in 2019
2019 establishments in Uttar Pradesh
Education in Gorakhpur